Duntisbourne Abbots Soulmate Devastation Technique is the seventh studio album by British IDM producer μ-Ziq, released on Planet Mu in 2007.

Track listing

Personnel
 Mike Paradinas – producer
 Matt Colton – mastering

References

External links
 

2007 albums
Mike Paradinas albums
Planet Mu albums